John Randolph Thayer (March 9, 1845 – December 19, 1916) was a representative from Massachusetts. He was born in Douglas, Massachusetts and attended the common schools and Nichols Academy in Dudley.

Thayer graduated from Yale College in 1869 where he studied law. He was admitted to the bar in 1871 and commenced practice in Worcester, Massachusetts. There, he served on the city council from 1874 to 1876 and was elected an alderman from 1878 to 1880.

He married Charlotte D. Holmes on January 30, 1872, and they had six children.

After unsuccessfully running for district attorney in 1876, he was elected a member of the Massachusetts House of Representatives in 1880 and 1881. He then ran for mayor of Worcester in 1886 without winning. He did serve in the State Senate from 1890 to 1891. After losing an election in 1892 to the 53rd United States Congress he was elected as a Democrat to the 56th, 57th, and 58th Congresses, serving from March 4, 1899 until March 3, 1905). Thayer did not seek reelection in 1904 but resumed his law practice in Worcester. He died there on December 19, 1916 and was buried at the Rural Cemetery.

References

External links
 

1845 births
1916 deaths
Nichols College alumni
Yale College alumni
Democratic Party Massachusetts state senators
Democratic Party members of the Massachusetts House of Representatives
Worcester, Massachusetts City Council members
People from Douglas, Massachusetts
Democratic Party members of the United States House of Representatives from Massachusetts
Burials at Rural Cemetery (Worcester, Massachusetts)
19th-century American politicians